Wankel AG is a German aircraft engine and automotive engine manufacturer based in Kirchberg, Saxony. The company specializes in the design and manufacture of Wankel engines for ultralight aircraft and also for kart racing cars.

The company is organized as an Aktiengesellschaft, a German share-owned limited corporation.

Products

The company's aircraft engine line consists of the single rotor Wankel AG LCR - 407 SGti four-stroke,  displacement, liquid-cooled, fuel injected, gasoline, Wankel engine that produces  at 6000 rpm and the dual rotor Wankel AG LCR - 814 TGti  displacement, liquid-cooled, fuel injected, gasoline, Wankel engine design, that produces  at 6000 rpm.

The kart engines offered include the LCR 407 SG/K (KR) and LCR 407 SG/W, both single rotor,  displacement, carburetor-equipped designs that produce  at 6800 rpm, plus the LCR 407 SG/KR, a single rotor,  displacement, carburetor-equipped design that produces  at 6900 rpm.

Aircraft engines
Summary of aircraft engines built by Wankel AG:
Wankel AG LCR - 407 SGti
Wankel AG LCR - 814 TGti

References

External links

Aircraft engine manufacturers of Germany